Chaka Apachita (Aymara chaka bridge, apachita the place of transit of an important pass in the principal routes of the Andes; name in the Andes for a stone cairn, a little pile of rocks built along the trail in the high mountains, Hispanicized spellings Chaca Apacheta, Chacapacheta) is a  mountain in the Andes of Peru. It is situated in the Moquegua Region, Mariscal Nieto Province, Carumas District. It lies northwest of Qiwña Milluku and southeast of Qina Qinani.

References

Mountains of Moquegua Region
Mountains of Peru